Archibald Craig (24 March 1887 – 30 December 1960) was a British fencer. He competed at the 1924 and 1948 Summer Olympics.

References

External links
 

1887 births
1960 deaths
British male fencers
Olympic fencers of Great Britain
Fencers at the 1924 Summer Olympics
Fencers at the 1948 Summer Olympics
People from Walton-on-Thames